This table displays the top-rated primetime television series of the 1976–77 season as measured by Nielsen Media Research.

References

1976 in American television
1977 in American television
1976-related lists
1977-related lists
Lists of American television series